For Bad Boys Only is a 2000 Hong Kong science fiction action romantic comedy film directed by Raymond Yip and starring Ekin Cheng, Louis Koo, Shu Qi, Kristy Yang and Daniel Chan.

Plot
"For Bad Boys Only" is an unconventional detective agency which specializes in helping clients to search for reunite with their first loves. The agency is managed by King Chan (Ekin Cheng), a flirty Casanova, and his partner, Jack Shum (Louis Koo), a perfectionist, with King's younger sister, Queen (Kristy Yang), who has a soft spot for Jack, being the only employee. Recently, Taiwanese tycoon Yung Wing-hing (Ko I-chen) hires the agency to search for his ex-lover, Koon Ching (Shu Qi), whom was Asia's premier female air force pilot. At the same time, a young man named Tin-ngai also hires the agency to search for his missing girlfriend, Shadow (Shu Qi). To King and Jack, Koon Ching and Shadow look strangely identical. Making matters more bizarre, King meets an amnesic girl named Eleven (Shu Qi), who also looks identical to Shadow and Koon Ching. The amorous-natured King also falls in love with Eleven. While searching for Eleven's true identity, King and Eleven were attacked multiple times before Eleven was captured by a group of gun-wielding mysterious men. At the same time, Tin-ngai also finds Shadow, who was disfigured. It turns out that Shadow was captured by Japanese scientist Taro Sakamoto (Mark Cheng), who retrieved DNA from Koon Ching's body and injected into Shadow, hoping to create a female pilot with similar skills. However, the experiment failed and Shadow was disfigured. However, Tin-ngai's love for Shadow did not change and decides to spend the rest of his life with her.

After King and Jack learns of this, they proceed to rescue Eleven. The two of them successfully sneak into Sakamoto's base, where they find dozens of clones that look identical to Eleven, each of them with different mutations. They were all named by numbers, with Eleven being the only perfect experiment with no mutations. However, Sakamoto manipulates Eleven to go mad to kill King and Jack.

Cast
Ekin Cheng as King Chan
Louis Koo as Jack Shum
Shu Qi as Eleven / Koon Ching / Shadow 
Kristy Yang as Queen Chan
Daniel Chan as Tin-ngai
Gigi Lai as Tiny
Mark Cheng as Taro Sakamoto
Jerry Lamb as Yung's henchman
 as Yung Wing-hing
Blackie Ko as Dark Tung
Frankie Ng as Police Officer
Law Lan as Sophia
Kong Hon as Gabie
Sammy Leung as Sammy
Kitty Yuen as Yee
Kelly Lin as Angel
Josie Ho as Jean
Stephanie Che as Marie
Anya Wu as DJ
Vincent Kok as Tiny's ex-boyfriend
Chan Yuk-fong
Kelly Chen
Lee Tat-chiu as Policeman
Leon Head

Reception

Critical
LoveHKFilm gave the film a negative review criticizing Manfred Wong's script as "overstuffed, underdeveloped, and embarrassing" and its "failed attempt" at charm and humor. Andrew Saroch of Far East Films gacve the film a score of 3 out of 5 stars criticizing its uninvolving romances and characters, poor camerawok, but praises some of its special effects.

Box office
The film grossed HK$7,266,320 at the Hong Kong box office during its theatrical run from 15 December 2000 to 4 January 2001.

References

External links

For Bad Boys Only at Hong Kong Cinemagic

2000 films
2000 romantic comedy films
2000 science fiction action films
Hong Kong action comedy films
Hong Kong romantic comedy films
Hong Kong science fiction action films
2000s science fiction comedy films
2000s Cantonese-language films
Films directed by Raymond Yip
Films about cloning
Films set in Hong Kong
Films shot in Hong Kong
Films set in Taiwan
2000s Hong Kong films